Hemiphileurus is a genus of rhinoceros beetles in the family Scarabaeidae. There are at least 60 described species in Hemiphileurus.

Species
These 60 species belong to the genus Hemiphileurus:

 Hemiphileurus agnus (Burmeister, 1847)
 Hemiphileurus beckeri (Kolbe, 1910)
 Hemiphileurus bispinosus Ratcliffe, 2001
 Hemiphileurus blandinae Dupuis, 1996
 Hemiphileurus brasiliensis Endrödi, 1978
 Hemiphileurus caliensis Endrödi, 1985
 Hemiphileurus carinatipennis Dupuis & Dechambre, 2000
 Hemiphileurus cavei Ratcliffe, 2003
 Hemiphileurus cayennensis Endrödi, 1985
 Hemiphileurus chantali Hardy & Dupuis, 2016
 Hemiphileurus complanatus (Palisot de Beauvois, 1809)
 Hemiphileurus cornutus Ratcliffe, 2014
 Hemiphileurus costatus Endrödi, 1978
 Hemiphileurus cubaensis (Chalumeau, 1981)
 Hemiphileurus curoei Ratcliffe, 2003
 Hemiphileurus curvicornis Dupuis & Dechambre, 2000
 Hemiphileurus cylindroides (Bates, 1888)
 Hemiphileurus dechambrei Ratcliffe, 2003
 Hemiphileurus dejeani (Bates, 1888)
 Hemiphileurus depressus (Fabricius, 1801)
 Hemiphileurus deslislesi Ratcliffe, 2001
 Hemiphileurus dispar (Kolbe, 1910)
 Hemiphileurus dyscritus Ratcliffe, 2003
 Hemiphileurus elbitae Neita & Ratcliffe, 2010
 Hemiphileurus elongatus Dupuis & Dechambre, 2000
 Hemiphileurus euniceae Ratcliffe & Cave, 2006
 Hemiphileurus flohri (Kolbe, 1910)
 Hemiphileurus gibbosus Dupuis & Dechambre, 2000
 Hemiphileurus gloriae Ponchel, 2009
 Hemiphileurus hiekei Chalumeau, 1988
 Hemiphileurus howdeni Endrödi, 1978
 Hemiphileurus illatus (LeConte, 1854)
 Hemiphileurus insularis Ratcliffe, 1988
 Hemiphileurus isabellae Dupuis, 2004
 Hemiphileurus jamaicensis (Howden, 1970)
 Hemiphileurus kahni Dupuis & Dechambre, 2000
 Hemiphileurus laevicauda (Bates, 1888)
 Hemiphileurus laeviceps Arrow, 1947
 Hemiphileurus laticollis (Burmeister, 1847)
 Hemiphileurus microps (Burmeister, 1847)
 Hemiphileurus nebulohylaeus Ratcliffe, 2003
 Hemiphileurus panamanius Ratcliffe & Curoe, 2011
 Hemiphileurus parvus Dupuis & Dechambre, 2000
 Hemiphileurus phratrius Ratcliffe & Ivie, 1998
 Hemiphileurus puertoricensis (Chapin, 1935)
 Hemiphileurus punctatostriatus (Prell, 1914)
 Hemiphileurus pygidiopunctissimus Ratcliffe, 2003
 Hemiphileurus quadridentatus Ratcliffe, 2001
 Hemiphileurus ratcliffei Dupuis, 2016
 Hemiphileurus rugulosus Endrödi, 1978
 Hemiphileurus ryani Ratcliffe & Ivie, 1998
 Hemiphileurus scutellatus Howden & Endrodi, 1978
 Hemiphileurus similis Dupuis & Dechambre, 2000
 Hemiphileurus simplex (Prell, 1914)
 Hemiphileurus tainorum Ratcliffe & Cave, 2015
 Hemiphileurus unilobus Dupuis & Dechambre, 2000
 Hemiphileurus variolosus (Burmeister, 1847)
 Hemiphileurus vicarius Prell, 1936
 Hemiphileurus vulgatus Dupuis & Dechambre, 2000
 Hemiphileurus warneri Ratcliffe, 2001

References

Further reading

 
 
 
 

Dynastinae
Articles created by Qbugbot